Hygrophorus penarioides is a species of mushroom in the Hygrophoraceae. Found in Sweden, it grows in a mycorrhizal association with oak trees. It was formerly identified as Hygrophorus penarius, a similar species typically found in association with both beech and oak; analysis of internal transcribed spacer sequence data demonstrated that the species were different.

See also

List of Hygrophorus species

References

penarioides
Fungi of Europe
Fungi described in 2007